"Never Tear Us Apart" is a song by Australian rock band INXS, released in June 1988 as the fourth single from their sixth studio album, Kick.

Background and composition
The music was written by keyboardist Andrew Farriss, who recorded a blues-style demo; vocalist Michael Hutchence wrote the lyrics.

"Never Tear Us Apart" is a ballad, written in the tempo of a modern Viennese waltz, layered with synthesizers and containing dramatic pauses before the instrumental breaks. Kirk Pengilly lends a saxophone solo near the end. According to the liner notes of Shine Like It Does: The Anthology (1979–1997), the song was composed on piano as a bluesy number in the style of Fats Domino. Producer Chris Thomas suggested a synth-based arrangement instead.

Music video
The video for the song, featuring an extended intro, was filmed in various locations in Prague along with "Guns in the Sky" and "New Sensation", all directed by Richard Lowenstein. As of December 2022, the video has a total view count of more than 93 million on YouTube from two versions, making it their most popular song on the platform.

Chart performance
The single reached No. 24 in the UK, and stayed on the charts for seven weeks. In the U.S., it reached No. 7 on the Billboard Hot 100.

In February 2014, after the Channel 7 screening of INXS: Never Tear Us Apart mini-series, "Never Tear Us Apart" charted again in Australia via download sales.  It peaked at No. 11 on the ARIA Singles Chart, surpassing its original peak position of No. 14 back in 1988.

Critical reception
Cash Box said that "more impassioned crooning from Hutchence elevates this song" and also praised the "searing sax solo."

Impact and legacy
After Hutchence's death in 1997, his coffin was carried out of St Andrew's Cathedral by the remaining members of INXS and his younger brother Rhett as "Never Tear Us Apart" was played in the background.

In January 2018, as part of Triple M's "Ozzest 100", listing the 'most Australian' songs of all time, "Never Tear Us Apart" was ranked number 18.

In 2021, it was listed at No. 282 on Rolling Stones "Top 500 Best Songs of All Time".

The song appears in Euphoria Season 2 Episode 3. During the cold open flashback, Cal dances and embraces his friend Derek to the song.

Charts

Weekly charts

Year-end charts

Certifications

Release history

Tom Jones feat. Natalie Imbruglia version

The song was covered by Tom Jones for his 1999 album Reload featuring the Australian singer Natalie Imbruglia. The cover version also includes a music video.

Track listing
CD single
 "Never Tear Us Apart" – 3:08
 "Sunny Afternoon" – 3:26
 "Looking Out My Window" – 3:19
 "Sometimes We Cry" – 5:00

Remix version: "Precious Heart"

In August 2001, a remix called "Precious Heart" was released as a single, and credited as Tall Paul vs. INXS.

Track listing
Australian CD single
 "Precious Heart" (Radio Edit) – 3:36
 "Precious Heart" (Original Mix) – 7:40
 "Precious Heart" (Riva Mix) – 7:40
 "Precious Heart" (Marc O'Toole Remix) – 8:41
 "Precious Heart" (Lush Mix) – 8:42

UK CD single
 "Precious Heart" (Radio Edit) – 3:36
 "Precious Heart" (Original Mix) – 7:40
 "Precious Heart" (Lush Mix) – 8:42

Charts

"Never Tear Us Apart" (2010 re-recording with Ben Harper and Mylène Farmer)

INXS re-recorded "Never Tear Us Apart" with Ben Harper and French singer Mylène Farmer, who wrote new French lyrics, for their twelfth studio album, Original Sin. The song was released on iTunes on 12 August 2010, and also as a promotional single to radio stations prior to the release of the album.

Paloma Faith version

"Never Tear Us Apart" was recorded by British singer Paloma Faith for a television advertisement campaign for John Lewis. The advert began airing in the UK from 15 September 2012. Faith later confirmed that the song would be released as her next single on 23 September 2012. She commented "I have always loved this song and I feel honoured to sing it." "Never Tear Us Apart" was released as the first single from the reissued version of Faith's second studio album Fall to Grace and serves as the third single overall. The artwork for the song shows the singer saluting, while wearing a metallic gold dress, with "a honeycomb-like bottom half".

Faith's version of the song can be heard on the opening scene of Law & Order: Special Victims Unit fifteenth-season episode "Beast's Obsession." It is also heard in the Netflix series Umbrella Academy. Faith’s version also appeared in the first episode of the Showtime series Yellowjackets.

Reception
Digital Spy's Lewis Corner gave Faith's version of the song four out of five stars. He stated "It's a brave task to reinterpret a much-loved hit, but Faith's soulful tones immediately thwart any doubts that she can't do the song justice." He added that while it was always going to be tough topping the original, Faith comes "admirably close."

Track listing
 Digital download
 "Never Tear Us Apart" – 3:05
 "Never Tear Us Apart" (Orchestral Version) – 3:05

Charts

Certifications

Release history

The Teskey Brothers version
In April 2021, The Teskey Brothers released a cover of "Never Tear Us Apart" in dedication to Michael Gudinski. Upon released, Josh said "This is an all-time classic Australian song that all of us love, its a pleasure to sing it and I don't know why we didn't do it earlier. We're very proud to dedicate this release to our friend Michael Gudinski who was a huge supporter of Australian music and The Teskey Brothers. Our two worlds collided and we will always be grateful for that."

Use by Port Adelaide Football Club
Since March 2014, Australian Football League club Port Adelaide has adopted "Never Tear Us Apart" as an unofficial anthem leading up to the opening bounce at its home ground, Adelaide Oval. It is a reference to various difficulties the club faced when trying to enter the AFL.

Port Adelaide’s use of the song stemmed from a trip to Anfield in November 2012 when Port Adelaide was in England to play an exhibition match against the Western Bulldogs. Seeing the Anfield crowd's rendition of "You'll Never Walk Alone", Matthew Richardson, Port's general manager of marketing and consumer business, sought to replicate the pre-match experience. At a meeting in mid-2013, the idea of an anthem was raised; various songs were suggested, including "Power and the Passion" by Midnight Oil and "Power to the People" by John Schumann. "Never Tear Us Apart" was suggested by Port Adelaide's events manager Tara MacLeod. It was eventually accepted, as it resonated with Port Adelaide’s history: when Port Adelaide entered the AFL in 1997, it was forced to cut ties with its traditional base, the Port Adelaide Magpies, forming separate administrations and causing division amongst supporters.

Initially, the song was introduced to coincide with the 60-second countdown before the start of a match, with the music playing over a video montage. Fans adopted the song, raising scarves above their heads as it was sung. By June 2014, the club printed scarves with the words "Never Tear Us Apart" on them that fans would hold aloft and sing in unison prior to the start of matches.

References

1980s ballads
1988 songs
1988 singles
1999 singles
2001 singles
2010 singles
2012 singles
Australian pop rock songs
Atlantic Records singles
ARIA Award-winning songs
INXS songs
Joe Cocker songs
Mercury Records singles
Newcastle Jets FC
Paloma Faith songs
Phonogram Records singles
Pop ballads
Port Adelaide Football Club
RCA Records singles
Rock ballads
Song recordings produced by Chris Thomas (record producer)
Songs written by Andrew Farriss
Songs written by Michael Hutchence
Warner Music Group singles
V2 Records singles